Dioxyna picciola  is a species of tephritid or fruit flies in the genus Dioxyna of the family Tephritidae. It feeds on a wide variety of Asteraceae.

Distribution
Canada, United States Costa Rica, Bermuda, West Indies.

References

Further reading

External links

 

Tephritinae
Diptera of North America
Insects described in 1857